Edward George Listopad (born August 28, 1929) is a former American football guard who played for the Chicago Cardinals. He played college football at Wake Forest University, having previously attended Patterson High School in Baltimore.

References

1929 births
Living people
American football guards
Wake Forest Demon Deacons football players
Chicago Cardinals players
Players of American football from Baltimore